Hayatur Rahman Khan is a Bangladesh Awami League politician and the former Member of Parliament of Mymensingh-2.

Career
Khan was elected to parliament from Mymensingh-2 as a Bangladesh Awami League candidate in 2008. His nomination triggered protests by Awami League activists who wanted Sharif Ahmed to be nominated.

References

Awami League politicians
Living people
9th Jatiya Sangsad members
Year of birth missing (living people)